MA Hamid (died on 25 July 2008) was a Bangladeshi sports organiser and a Bangladesh Army lieutenant colonel. He was the founder of the Bangladesh Handball Federation, the president of the Army Sports Control Board and the vice chairman of the National Sports Council. He was the recipient of Bangladesh National Sports Award (2006) in the organiser category.

Career
In 1975, Hamid served as the station commander of Dhaka Cantonment.

Hamid wrote a book "Three Army Coups and Some Untold Tales".

Personal life
Hamid's wife, Rani Hamid, is a Woman International Master. Their eldest son, Kaiser Hamid, was the captain of the Bangladesh national football team for several years, the second son, Sohel Hamid, was a national squash champion and the youngest son, Bobby Hamid, is a football player.

References

1930s births
2008 deaths
Bangladesh Army colonels
Bangladeshi sportsmen
Recipients of the Bangladesh National Sports Award
Place of birth missing